St. Jude Children's Research Hospital is a pediatric treatment and research facility located in Memphis, Tennessee. Founded by entertainer Danny Thomas in 1962, it is a 501(c)(3) designated nonprofit medical corporation which focuses on children's catastrophic diseases, particularly leukemia and other cancers. In the 2021 fiscal year, St. Jude received $2 billion in donations. Daily operating costs average $1.7 million, but patients are not charged for their care. St. Jude treats patients up to age 21, and for some conditions, up to age 25.

History

St. Jude was founded by entertainer Danny Thomas in 1962, with help from Lemuel Diggs and Thomas' close friend from Miami, automobile dealer Anthony Abraham. The hospital was founded on the premise that "no child should die in the dawn of life". This idea resulted from a promise that Thomas, a Maronite Catholic, had made to a saint years before the hospital was founded. Thomas was a comedian who was struggling to get a break in his career and living paycheck to paycheck. When his first child was about to be born, he attended Mass in Detroit, and put seven dollars in the offering bin. He prayed for intercession to Saint Jude Thaddeus for a means to provide for his family, and about a week later, he obtained a gig that paid 10 times what he had put in the offering bin. Thomas promised St. Jude Thaddeus that if the saint interceded for his success, he would build him a shrine. Years later, Thomas became a successful comedian and built St. Jude Children's Research Hospital as a shrine to St. Jude Thaddeus to honor his promise.

While some donations for St. Jude come from government grants and insurance recoveries, the principal source of funding comes from the American Lebanese Syrian Associated Charities (ALSAC), a semi-independent entity founded in 1957 by Danny Thomas. ALSAC serves primarily to raise funds and promote awareness for St. Jude. They largely collect funds from independent sources, such as companies and individuals.

Memphis was chosen at the suggestion of Catholic Cardinal Samuel Stritch, a Tennessee native who had been a spiritual advisor to Thomas since he presided at Thomas's confirmation in Thomas's boyhood home of Toledo, Ohio.

Although it was named after Thomas's patron saint, St. Jude is not a Catholic hospital and is a secular institution not affiliated with any religious organization.

In 2007, Chili's restaurant chain pledged $50 million to fund the construction of the seven-story Chili's Care Center, adding , providing space for the department of radiological services, The Pediatric Brain Tumor Consortium, two floors of outpatient clinics, one floor of inpatient clinics and rooms, two floors of laboratory space, an office floor and an unfinished level for future expansion.

In 2014, the Marlo Thomas Center for Global Education and Collaboration was opened as part of the hospital. In 2017, the St. Jude Graduate School of Biomedical Sciences accepted its inaugural class of PhD students.

Hospital functions & effects

St. Jude has an International Outreach Program to improve the survival rates of children with catastrophic illnesses worldwide. 

St. Jude treats patients up to age 21 and for some conditions, up to age 25.

Corporate structure
Donald Pinkel was the first director of St. Jude and served from 1962 until 1973. His successor, Alvin Mauer, was director from 1973 to 1983. Joseph Simone was the hospital's third director from 1983 to 1992. Arthur W. Nienhuis was CEO and director of St. Jude from 1993 until 2004. William E. Evans, the hospital's fifth director, served from 2004 to 2014. He was succeeded by current CEO and director James R. Downing on July 15, 2014.

, St. Jude's scientific director was James I. Morgan, Ph.D.

St. Jude Board of Directors is chaired by Paul J. Ayoub and includes Joyce Aboussie, Ruth Gaviria, Tom Penn, and Tony Thomas (producer).

Awards and achievements
St. Jude and over 46 of its staff members have been the recipients of numerous awards and achievements. In 2022, St. Jude Children's Research Hospital was named the second best children's cancer hospital in the U.S by U.S. News & World Report. It has also been named one of the top 10 companies to work for in academia by The Scientist for 7 successive years. Peter C. Doherty, Ph.D., of St. Jude Children's Research Hospital was co-recipient of the 1996 Nobel Prize in Physiology or Medicine for work related to how the immune system kills virus-infected cells. St. Jude Children's Research Hospital won the 2020 Webby Award for Health & Fitness in the category Apps, Mobile & Voice.

Affiliated hospitals
St. Jude is associated with several affiliated hospitals in the United States. This program is a network of hematology clinics, hospitals, and universities that are united under the mission of St. Jude.

These sites are used as a means of referring eligible patients to St. Jude as well as a location to administer some care. Through the Domestic Affiliates Program staff at St. Jude work together and collaborate with those at the other institutions. Affiliated sites are expected to comply with standards set by St. Jude and are audited to ensure proper and quality care.

Currently the Domestic Affiliate Clinic sites include:

 Our Lady of the Lake Regional Medical Center, in Baton Rouge, Louisiana
 Novant Health Hemby Children's Hospital, in Charlotte, North Carolina
 Huntsville Hospital for Women & Children, in Huntsville, Alabama
 Johnson City Medical Center, in Johnson City, Tennessee
 St. Jude Midwest Affiliate, Children's Hospital of Illinois in Peoria, Illinois
 Louisiana State University, Department of Pediatrics, in Shreveport, Louisiana
 Mercy Children's Hospital, in Springfield, Missouri
 The Children's Hospital at Saint Francis, in Tulsa, Oklahoma

St. Jude also works with Le Bonheur Children's Medical Center, also located in downtown Memphis. St. Jude patients needing certain procedures, such as brain surgery, may undergo procedures at LeBonheur Hospital.  Both St. Jude and Le Bonheur are teaching hospitals affiliated with the University of Tennessee Health Science Center. University of Tennessee physicians training in pediatrics, surgery, radiology, and other specialties undergo service rotations at St. Jude Hospital.

The Children's Cancer Center of Lebanon was established in Beirut on April 12, 2002. The center is an affiliate of St. Jude Children's Research Hospital and works in association with the American University of Beirut Medical Center (AUBMC).

A commitment has been made to establish a  research facility in Memphis, Tennessee, one purpose of which will be to serve as a collaborative hub.

Funding

St. Jude Children's Research Hospital and American Lebanese Syrian Associated Charities (ALSAC) are both nonprofits. In 2019, ALSAC raised $1.9 billion from donations, of which $975 million (51%) went to St. Jude. The rest of the funds were either spent on functional expenses for ALSAC or added to their fund balance, which totaled $5.7 billion at the end of 2019. In 2020, ALSAC raised $2.4 billion, of which $2 billion were from donations and contributions (84%). $997 million (42%) of this went to St. Jude. At the end of 2020, St Jude's fund balance was $8.03 billion. 74% percent of St. Jude's total budget comes from donations, and the hospital costs about $1.7 million per day to run.

All medically eligible patients who are accepted for treatment at St. Jude are treated without regard to the family's ability to pay. Families of patients at St. Jude do not pay for treatments that are not covered by insurance, and families without insurance do not need to pay for any expense. All families do not need to pay for travel, housing, or food.

Three separate specially-designed patient housing facilities—Tri Delta Place for short-term (up to one week), Ronald McDonald House for medium-term (one week to 3 months), and Target House for long-term (3 months or more)—provide housing for patients and up to three family members. These policies, along with research expenses and other costs, add up to approximately $1.7 million in operating costs each day.

Philanthropic aid
In January 1964, the former presidential yacht USS Potomac was purchased by Elvis Presley for US$55,000. Presley then gave the Potomac to St. Jude Children's Research Hospital, in Memphis, to sell as a fundraiser.

From 2000 to 2005, 83.7% of every dollar received by St. Jude went to the current or future needs of St. Jude. In 2002 to 2004, 47% of program expenses went to patient care and 41% to research. In 2012, 81 cents of every dollar donated to St. Jude went directly to its research and treatment.

To cover operating costs, ALSAC conducts many fundraising events and activities. The WGC Invitational, a PGA Tour event, is one of the most visible fundraising events for the hospital. Other fundraising programs include the St. Jude Math-A-Thon, Up 'til Dawn, direct mailings, radiothons and television marketing.

Thanks and Giving
In November 2004, St. Jude launched its inaugural Thanks and Giving campaign which encourages consumers to help raise funds at participating retailers by adding a donation at checkout or by purchasing specialty items to benefit St. Jude.

Corporations give customers a host of opportunities to support St. Jude. The ultimate goal is to increase awareness with the hope that people will come to identify Thanksgiving with St. Jude, said Joyce Aboussie, vice chairwoman of the nonprofit's board. The official kick-off event for the Thanks and Giving campaign is the Give Thanks Walk. This event is a noncompetitive 5K that is now held in 75 cities across the country. Those participating in the race are encouraged to form teams, invite family and friends, and raise money for St. Jude. These walks have raised over $11 million to date.

Other funding initiatives

At various college campuses, some student organizations, fraternities and sororities raise funds in a program called Up 'til Dawn.

Phi Mu Delta National Fraternity is partnered with St. Jude Children's Research Hospital.

Tau Kappa Epsilon (TKE) Fraternity partnered with St. Jude in the 1970s and 1980s to help raise money to fight childhood cancer. The fraternity renewed its link to St. Jude as its philanthropy of emphasis in 2008.

St. Jude is an International Philanthropic Project of Epsilon Sigma Alpha International, a co-ed service sorority. As of April 2013, ESA has raised more than $160 million in cash and pledges for St. Jude.

In 1999, the Delta Delta Delta collegiate sorority formed a philanthropic partnership with St. Jude. Tri Delta supports St. Jude nationally and supports cancer charities at a local level.  At the hospital in Memphis, the sorority donated the Teen Room for teenage patients to relax and spend time with each other. In July 2010, Tri Delta completed its "10 by 10" goal, raising over $10 million in less than four years, six years short of the original goal. Those funds were used to sponsor the Tri Delta Patient Care Floor in the Chili's Care Center. Upon completion of the "10 by 10" campaign, the sorority announced a new fundraising goal of $15 million in 5 years to name the Specialty Clinic located in the Patient Care Center. Three and a half years later, Delta Delta Delta had raised $15 million and completed its goal ahead of schedule. In July 2014, the on-campus residence center was renamed Tri Delta Place as a result of Tri Delta's pledge of $60 Million in 10 years.

Another fundraising is the Country Cares for St. Jude Kids radiothon. During these events, country radio stations around the country allow those involved with St. Jude to share stories with listeners, who are encouraged to donate. Country artists have also supported St. Jude through concerts, hospital visits, call-ins, and other forms of support.

Since 2001 the St. Jude Memphis Marathon has raised over $90 million for the children and families at St. Jude Children's Research Hospital.

Eagles for St. Jude was a program created in 2007 by Stanford Financial Group, when it paid to become title sponsor of the St. Jude Classic, the annual PGA Tour event in Memphis. The program, and sponsorship, ended in February 2009, when it was found that Stanford Financial Group was a Ponzi scheme, having defrauded investors out of $8 billion, with a small fraction of that stolen money having been channeled into the Eagles for St. Jude program.

McDonald's Monopoly Game
In 1995, St. Jude received an anonymous letter postmarked in Dallas, Texas, containing a $1 million winning McDonald's Monopoly game piece.  McDonald's officials came to the hospital, accompanied by a representative from the accounting firm Arthur Andersen, and verified it as a winner. Although game rules prohibited the transfer of prizes, and even after learning that the piece was sent by an individual involved in an embezzlement scheme intended to defraud McDonald's, McDonald's waived the rule and made the annual $50,000 annuity payments.

Inspiration4 Fundraiser

In 2021, Shift4 Payments founder Jared Isaacman partnered with St. Jude to raise funds and awareness for the hospital around Inspiration4, the first all-civilian mission to space. Isaacman, who funded the flight, led the flight as mission commander alongside mission pilot Dr. Sian Proctor, medical officer Hayley Arceneaux, a St. Jude cancer survivor, and mission specialist Christopher Sembroski. Sembroski won his seat a fundraising initiative for St. Jude. Isaacman committed to give $100 million to St. Jude and invited the public to join him in attempting to raise upwards of $200 million or more in support of St. Jude’s multi-billion dollar expansion. SpaceX CEO and Chief Engineer Elon Musk also committed to donating $50 million to St. Jude.

Celebrity visitors

Over the years, many celebrities such as musicians, political figures, actors and others have become involved with this foundation, visiting the hospital to meet some of the patients and/or filming commercials to encourage individuals to donate to St. Jude. These include:
 Jennifer Aniston
Drew Barrymore
 Luis Fonsi
 Michelle Obama while First Lady of the United States
 Elizabeth Olsen
Darius Rucker
 Sofia Vergara

References

External links

 St.Jude Children's Research Hospital Website

 
Children's hospitals in the United States
Hospitals in Memphis, Tennessee
Medical research institutes in the United States
Research institutes in Tennessee
Hospital buildings completed in 1962
Hospitals established in 1962
Organizations established in 1962
Voluntary hospitals
1962 establishments in Tennessee